The 2nd Royal Bavarian Uhlan Regiment was a Bavarian Army Cavalry Regiment formed in 1863 in Ansbach. From 6 July 1864 it was nominally commanded by King Ludwig II of Bavaria until he was succeeded by King Otto of Bavaria on 13 June 1886.

Peacetime service and uniform
The regiment was part of the 4th Cavalry Brigade of then II Royal Bavarian Army Corps and later III Royal Bavarian Army Corps. The peacetime uniform was of dark green with crimson plastron and facings. A czapka with crimson top and white plume was worn in full dress.

Active Service
During the Franco-Prussian War the 2.Ulanen Regiment fought at Worth and Sedan in August and September 1870. It then undertook patrol work during the Siege of Paris. 

In August 1914 the regiment saw action at the Battle of the Marne and in Flanders. It was subsequently transferred to the Eastern Front.

Disbandment
In common with the other Royal Bavarian cavalry regiments, the 2.Ulanen Regiment was disbanded in February 1919. Between the wars its traditions were preserved by the 2nd Squadron of the Reiter-Regiment Nr. 17 which formed part of the garrison of Ansbach.

List of Officers - 1863

See also
List of Imperial German cavalry regiments

References

Sources

 

Cavalry regiments of the Bavarian Army
Regiments of the German Army in World War I
Military units and formations established in 1863
1863 establishments in Bavaria
1919 disestablishments in Germany
Military units and formations disestablished in 1919